R39 road may refer to:
 R397 road (Ireland)
 R397 road (South Africa)